Centaurea paniculata, the Jersey knapweed, is a species of Centaurea found in France and northern Italy.

References

External links

paniculata